Rusty Smith may refer to:

Rusty Smith (speed skater) (born 1979), American short track speed skater
Rusty Smith (American football) (born 1987), American football quarterback